Signature is the twelfth album by R&B singer Patrice Rushen.

Track listing
All songs written by Patrice Rushen except where noted.

"Almost Home" - 4:26
"Days Gone By" - 5:04
"The Sweetest Taboo" (Sade, Andrew Hale, Stuart Matthewman, Dexter Wansel) - 5:21
"Sneaky Pete" - 4:12
"Softly" - 6:11
"Hurry up This Way Again" (Cynthia Biggs) - 6:03
"L 'Ésprit de Joie (The Spirit of Joy)" - 4:40
"Wise Ol' Souls" - 4:30
"Oneness" - 5:00
"Arrival" - 4:33

Personnel 
 Patrice Rushen – synthesizer programming, drum programming, keyboards (1-6, 8-10), vocals (3, 6), acoustic piano (7)
 Doc Powell – guitar (1, 2, 4, 8)
 Paul Jackson Jr. – guitar (3, 6, 10)
 Freddie Washington – bass (4, 6, 8, 10)
 Neil Stubenhaus – bass (7)
 Leon "Ndugu" Chancler – drums (1, 2, 6, 7, 9, 10)
 Alvino Bennett – drums (4, 8)
 Munyungo Jackson – percussion (1, 2, 4, 5, 7, 8)
 Paulinho da Costa – percussion (3, 6, 10)
 Gary Bias – soprano saxophone (5)
 Kirk Whalum – tenor saxophone (6)
 Gerald Albright – alto saxophone (7)
 Raymond Lee Brown – muted trumpet (5)
 Jeff Ramsey – vocals (3)

References

1997 albums
Patrice Rushen albums